James Henderson may refer to:

Academics
 James Blacklock Henderson (1871–1950), Scottish inventor, engineer, and professor
 James (Sákéj) Youngblood Henderson (born 1944), American indigenous law scholar
 James G. Henderson (born 1945), professor at Kent State University
 James Henderson (surgeon) (1829–1865), British physician, surgeon, and author

Politicians 
 James Douglas Henderson (1927–2020), Alberta MLA from 1963 to 1975
 James Henderson (Irish politician) (1846–1924), Lord Mayor of Belfast
 James Henry Dickey Henderson (1810–1885), United States Representative from Oregon 
 James M. Henderson (1921–1995), American businessman and politician
 James Pinckney Henderson (1808–1858), American politician, first governor of Texas
 James W. Henderson (1817–1880), American politician, fourth governor of Texas
 James Henderson Jr. (1942-2022), American politician, member of the Arizona State Senate
 Jim Henderson (politician) (1940–2020), Canadian politician
 Barry Henderson (James Stewart Barry Henderson, born 1936), Scottish member of the House of Commons

Sports
 Big James Henderson (born 1965), American powerlifter, preacher and motivational speaker
 James Henderson (cricketer, born 1975), South African cricketer
 James Henderson (cricketer, born 1918) (1918—2004), Scottish cricketer and educator
 James Henderson (footballer, born 1867) (1867–?), Scottish footballer (Rangers, Arsenal)
 James Henderson (footballer, born 1870) (1870–?), Scottish footballer (Liverpool)
 James Henderson (footballer, born 1871) (1871–?), Scottish footballer (Bury)
 James Henderson (footballer, born 1877) (1877–?), English footballer (Reading, Bradford City, Leeds City)
James Henderson (Newcastle United footballer), English footballer
 James Milne Henderson (1891–1917), Scottish rugby union player and British Army officer
 Skip Henderson (James Henderson, born 1965), American college basketball player
 Jim Henderson (baseball) (born 1982), Canadian professional baseball pitcher
 Jim Henderson (footballer), Scottish footballer

Others
 James Henderson (artist) (1871–1951), Canadian artist
 James Henderson (businessman) (born 1964), English public relations executive
 James Henderson (minister) (1820–1905), Presbyterian minister in Victoria and South Australia
 James Henderson (priest) (1840–1935), Archdeacon of Northumberland
 James Henderson (publisher) (1823–1906), British publisher of newspapers, comics, books and postcards
 James A. Henderson, chairman and CEO of Cummins Inc.
 James Henderson (moderator) (1797–1874),  Scottish minister of the Free Church of Scotland
 Jim Henderson (sportscaster) (born 1947), American sportscaster
 Jimmy Henderson (musician) (1921–1998), jazz trombonist and bandleader

See also 
 Jamie Henderson (born 1979), American football player